Ola Mikael Rosendahl (1 October 1939, in Pernå – 17 March 2008) was a Finnish agronomist, farmer and politician. He was a member of the Parliament of Finland from 1995 to 2003, representing the Swedish People's Party of Finland (SFP).

References

1939 births
2008 deaths
People from Pernå
Swedish-speaking Finns
Swedish People's Party of Finland politicians
Members of the Parliament of Finland (1995–99)
Members of the Parliament of Finland (1999–2003)
University of Helsinki alumni